Christopher Hourigan is a physician-scientist known for work on measurable residual disease (MRD; previously termed minimal residual disease) in acute myeloid leukemia.

He is the Chief of the Laboratory of Myeloid Malignancies at the National Heart, Lung, and Blood Institute of the National Institutes of Health in Bethesda, Maryland.

Education 
Hourigan graduated from Oxford University Medical School and received his DPhil for work with Sir John Bell (physician) at the Weatherall Institute of Molecular Medicine at Oxford University. He completed postdoctoral clinical training at Guy's and St Thomas' Hospital in London, Johns Hopkins Bayview Medical Center, and the Sidney Kimmel Comprehensive Cancer Center at Johns Hopkins Hospital in Baltimore. He is ABIM board certified in Internal Medicine, Hematology, and Medical Oncology.

Research 
Hourigan is best known for work on Measurable Residual Disease (MRD) and precision medicine in Acute Myeloid Leukemia (AML).  This included the demonstration that intervention in patients with AML MRD may improve survival, 
that low-level TP53 mutations are detectable pre-transplantation in patients with sickle cell disease who develop myeloid malignancy after hematopoietic stem cell transplantation, and that patient-personalized single cell sequencing can distinguish mutations associated with non-malignant cells rather than residual AML. He holds senior leadership positions in the European Leukemia Network (ELN) guidelines committee for AML MRD, the Foundation for the National Institutes of Health (fNIH) biomarkers consortium for AML MRD, the National Cancer Institute (NCI) MyeloMATCH precision medicine initiative, the Center for International Blood and Marrow Transplant Research (CIBMTR) and on the American Society of Hematology (ASH) guidelines committee for AML in older adults.

Honors and awards 
In 2019, Hourigan received a Presidential Early Career Award for Scientists and Engineers for his research on Measurable Residual Disease in Acute Myeloid Leukemia.

In 2020, Hourigan was awarded the National Heart, Lung, and Blood Institute Orloff Award and honored for one of the top NIH accomplishments of 2020.

Selected publications 
Hourigan, C. S., Dillon, L. W., Gui, G., Logan, B. R., Fei, M., Ghannam, J., ... & Horwitz, M. E. (2020). Impact of conditioning intensity of allogeneic transplantation for acute myeloid leukemia with genomic evidence of residual disease. Journal of Clinical Oncology, 38(12), 1273-1283. 
Schuurhuis GJ, Heuser M, Freeman S, Béné MC, Buccisano F, Cloos J, Grimwade D, Haferlach T, Hills RK, Hourigan CS, Jorgensen JL. Minimal/measurable residual disease in AML: a consensus document from the European LeukemiaNet MRD Working Party. Blood, The Journal of the American Society of Hematology. 2018 Mar 22;131(12):1275-91.  
Tyner JW, Tognon CE, Bottomly D, Wilmot B, Kurtz SE, Savage SL, Long N, Schultz AR, Traer E, Abel M, Agarwal A. Functional genomic landscape of acute myeloid leukaemia. Nature. 2018 Oct;562(7728):526-31. (PMC open access) 
Hourigan, C. S., & Karp, J. E. (2013). Minimal residual disease in acute myeloid leukaemia. Nature reviews Clinical oncology, 10(8), 460-471. 
Hourigan, C. S., Gale, R. P., Gormley, N. J., Ossenkoppele, G. J., & Walter, R. B. (2017). Measurable residual disease testing in acute myeloid leukaemia. Leukemia, 31(7), 1482-1490.

References

External links 
Hourigan Lab website

Year of birth missing (living people)
Living people

Physician-scientists
Leukemia
21st-century American scientists